Lophocampa baorucoensis is a moth of the family Erebidae. It was described by Benoît Vincent in 2005. It is found in the Dominican Republic.

References

 Natural History Museum Lepidoptera generic names catalog
Lophocampa baorucoiensis at BOLD Systems

baorucoensis
Moths described in 2005